João de Santarém (15th century) was a Portuguese explorer who discovered São Tomé (in December 21, 1471), Annobón (in January 1472) and Príncipe (January 17, 1472). Together with Pêro Escobar, he also encountered the town of Sassandra in the Ivory Coast in 1471 and 1472, explored the African land from Ghana up to the Niger Delta.  From 1484 he was captain of Alcatrazes (around Santiago or Brava) in Cape Verde.

In January 1471, João de Santarém and Pêro de Escobar discovered "the traffic of gold at the place we now call Mina" (present-day Elmina).

See also
European exploration of Africa#Portuguese expeditions

References

External links
Article of João de Santarém at the Historical Dictionary 

Year of birth unknown
Place of birth unknown
Year of death unknown
Place of death unknown
Portuguese explorers
15th-century explorers of Africa
Maritime history of Portugal
History of São Tomé and Príncipe
15th-century Portuguese people
Colonial heads of Cape Verde
Portuguese colonial governors and administrators